Vidyadhar Govind Oak, I.C.S., (born 18 May 1909) was an Indian bureaucrat and Chief Justice of Allahabad High Court.

Career
Oak studied in Maharaja College, Government Madhav Arts and Commerce College, Ujjain and Holkar College of Indore. He graduated in Law from the Allahabad University and joined the Indian Civil Service on 12 October 1931. Initially Oak served as Assistant Collector and Joint Magistrate under the Uttar Pradesh Government in British India for five years and thereafter became District Judge. In 1954 he was the District Judge of Allahabad. He also worked as Judicial Commissioner of Ajmer for few months. In 1955 he was appointed Additional Judge of the Allahabad High Court. Justice Oak was elevated in the post of the Chief Justice on 4 June 1957. He retired from the judgeship in 1971.

Legacy 
The Astronomical Society of India gives the Justice V.G. Oak Award to Indian researchers for outstanding thesis in Astronomy.

References

1909 births
Indian diplomats
Indian judges
20th-century Indian judges
Judges of the Allahabad High Court
Chief Justices of the Allahabad High Court
Indian Civil Service (British India) officers
Indian civil servants
Indian government officials
University of Allahabad alumni
Year of death missing
People from Ujjain